Alexa Guarachi Mathison (born 17 November 1990) is an American-born Chilean tennis player who specialises in doubles.
She reached her career-high doubles ranking of world No. 11 in September 2021, and has won five titles on the WTA Tour, most notably the 2021 Dubai Championships alongside Darija Jurak.
Guarachi reached her first Grand Slam final at the 2020 French Open with Desirae Krawczyk, and the pair were also semifinalists at the 2021 US Open. They also qualified for the 2021 WTA Finals.

Guarachi has represented Chile in the Billie Jean King Cup since 2018, and achieved her highest singles ranking of world No. 347 in November 2015.

Performance timelines

Only main-draw results in WTA Tour, Grand Slam tournaments, Fed Cup/Billie Jean King Cup and Olympic Games are included in win–loss records.

Doubles
Current through the 2023 Australian Open.

Mixed doubles

Significant finals

Grand Slam tournament finals

Doubles: 1 (runner-up)

WTA 1000 finals

Doubles: 1 (title)

WTA career finals

Doubles: 11 (5 titles, 6 runner-ups)

WTA 125 tournament finals

Doubles: 1 (runner-up)

ITF Circuit finals

Singles: 3 (1 title, 2 runner–ups)

Doubles: 28 (20 titles, 8 runner–ups)

Notes

References

External links

 
 
 
 Alexa Guarachi Climbs The Tennis Ladder

1990 births
Living people
Chilean female tennis players
American female tennis players
American people of Chilean descent
Sportspeople of Chilean descent
Chilean people of American descent
Naturalized citizens of Chile
South American Games medalists in tennis
South American Games gold medalists for Chile
Competitors at the 2018 South American Games
Pan American Games medalists in tennis
Pan American Games gold medalists for Chile
Tennis players at the 2019 Pan American Games
Alabama Crimson Tide women's tennis players
People from Fort Walton Beach, Florida
Medalists at the 2019 Pan American Games
Tennis people from Florida
Citizens of Chile through descent